The Chilean manual alphabet is used by the Chilean deaf community to sign Spanish words and is incorporated into Chilean Sign Language. It is a one-handed alphabet, similar enough to the American manual alphabet for the two to be mutually intelligible, except for the letters Q (touch the jaw), T (touch the lips), S and X (trace the letter shapes, as is done with Z), U (horns, like a 7 or 8), and the additional letter Ñ (a rocking N). 

Manual alphabet
Disability in Chile